The 2019 Doha Diamond League was the 21st edition of the annual outdoor track and field meeting in Doha, Qatar. Held on 3 May 2019 at the Khalifa International Stadium, it was the first leg of the 2019 IAAF Diamond League – the highest level international track and field circuit.

A total of eight world-leading performances were set at the competition, three of which were also meeting records. Daniel Ståhl of Sweden gave the highlight of the meeting with six straight discus throws beyond 69.50 m (the first man ever to deliver such as series) including a Diamond League record of 70.56 m. Caster Semenya of South Africa won the women's 800 metres in a meet record of 1:54.98 minutes and American Dalilah Muhammad improved the previous women's 400 metres hurdles record with her time of 53.61 seconds. The other world leaders on the men's side came from Nijel Amos of Botswana (1:44.29 in the 800 m), Kenyan Elijah Manangoi (3:32.21 in the 1500 metres) and Soufiane El Bakkali of Morocco (8:07.22 in the 3000 metres steeplechase). Great Britain's Dina Asher-Smith ran a world leading time of 22.26 to win the women's 200 metres and Kenya's Hellen Obiri overcame Genzebe Dibaba to win the women's 3000 metres in 8:25.60 minutes. The latter was among the highlights of the meet in terms of strength in depth, as it saw eight athletes achieve lifetime bests. The men's shot put also produced high quality performances, with winner Ryan Crouser and runner-up Tom Walsh both going beyond twenty-two metres.

Diamond League Results
Athletes competing in the Diamond League disciplines earned extra compensation and points which went towards qualifying for one of two Diamond League finals (either Zürich or Brussels depending on the discipline). First place earned 8 points, with each step down in place earning one less point than the previous, until no points are awarded in 9th place or lower.

Men

Women

Qatari national results

Men

Boys

Girls

Mixed

See also
2019 Diamond League Shanghai (next Diamond League event)
2019 Weltklasse Zürich (first half of the Diamond League final)
2019 Memorial Van Damme (second half of the Diamond League final)

References

Results
Results Doha 2019. Sport Result. Retrieved 2019-08-26.

External links
Official Doha Diamond League website

2019
Doha
Doha Diamond League
Doha Diamond League
May 2019 sports events in Asia
Sports competitions in Doha